In fluid dynamics, dynamic pressure (denoted by  or  and sometimes called velocity pressure) is the quantity defined by:

where (in SI units):
 is the dynamic pressure in pascals (i.e., kg/(m*s2),
 is the fluid mass density (e.g. in kg/m3), and
 is the flow speed in m/s.

It can be thought of as the fluid's kinetic energy per unit volume.

For incompressible flow, the dynamic pressure of a fluid is the difference between its total pressure and static pressure. From Bernoulli's law, dynamic pressure is given by

Physical meaning 
Dynamic pressure is the kinetic energy per unit volume of a fluid. Dynamic pressure is one of the terms of Bernoulli's equation, which can be derived from the conservation of energy for a fluid in motion.

It can also appear as a term in the incompressible Navier-Stokes equation which may be written:

By a vector calculus identity

so that for incompressible, irrotational flow, the second term on the left in the Navier-Stokes equation is just the gradient of the dynamic pressure.

At a stagnation point the dynamic pressure is equal to the difference between the stagnation pressure and the static pressure, so the dynamic pressure in a flow field can be measured at a stagnation point.

Therefore, by looking at the variation of  during flight, it is possible to determine how the stress will vary and in particular when it will reach its maximum value. The point of maximum aerodynamic load is often referred to as max q and it is a critical parameter in many applications, such as launch vehicles.

Uses

The dynamic pressure, along with the static pressure and the pressure due to elevation, is used in Bernoulli's principle as an energy balance on a closed system. The three terms are used to define the state of a closed system of an incompressible, constant-density fluid.

When the dynamic pressure is divided by the product of fluid density and acceleration due to gravity, g, the result is called velocity head, which is used in head equations like the one used for pressure head and hydraulic head. In a venturi flow meter, the differential pressure head can be used to calculate the differential velocity head, which are equivalent in the adjacent picture. An alternative to velocity head is dynamic head.

Compressible flow 
Many authors define dynamic pressure only for incompressible flows. (For compressible flows, these authors use the concept of impact pressure.) However, the definition of dynamic pressure can be extended to include compressible flows.

For compressible flow the isentropic relations can be used (also valid for incompressible flow):

Where:
{| border="0" cellpadding="0"
|-
| style="text-align:right;" |  || Mach number (non-dimensional),
|-
| style="text-align:right;" |  || ratio of specific heats (non-dimensional; 1.4 for air at sea-level conditions),
|}

See also 
 Pressure
 Pressure head
 Hydraulic head
 Total dynamic head
 Drag, lift and pitching moment coefficients
 Derivations of Bernoulli equation

References 
 L. J. Clancy (1975), Aerodynamics, Pitman Publishing Limited, London. 
 Houghton, E.L. and Carpenter, P.W. (1993), Aerodynamics for Engineering Students, Butterworth and Heinemann, Oxford UK.

Notes

External links 
 Definition of dynamic pressure on Eric Weisstein's World of Science

Fluid dynamics